Palumbina fissilis is a moth of the family Gelechiidae. It was described by Edward Meyrick in 1918. It is found in Assam, India.

The wingspan is about 8 mm. The forewings are grey with white markings and a narrow inwardly oblique fascia at one-third, as well as two transversely placed connected triangular spots in the disc at two-thirds. There is a spot crossing the wing near the apex. The hindwings are grey.

References

Moths described in 1918
Palumbina
Taxa named by Edward Meyrick